Chris Kraus (born 1955) is an American writer and filmmaker. She is the author of I Love Dick.

Biography 
Christine Kraus was born in The Bronx, New York City, and spent her childhood in Milford, Connecticut, and New Zealand. Kraus completed a BA in literature and political theory at Victoria University of Wellington, beginning at the university at the age of 16. She worked as a journalist for five years after the completion of her BA. When she was 21 she arrived in New York, where she began studying with actor Ruth Maleczech and director Lee Breuer, whose studio in the East Village was called ReCherChez.

Kraus is Jewish and deals with many spiritual and social aspects of Judaism in her works. She says that her parents attended Christian church and did not tell her that her family is Jewish until she moved back to Manhattan at age 21, possibly to shield her from antisemitism.

She continued to make films through the mid-1990s. As of 2006 she was married to Sylvère Lotringer, a Jewish man who survived the Holocaust as a child. They had divorced by 2016. Some of her works are based on her marriage and her ex-husband.

Kraus' I Love Dick was first published in North America in 1997, initially receiving a poor reception but going on to become a popular success. At first, according to Anakana Schofield of The Irish Times, the novel was only a "cult hit" among the visual arts community and did not receive much attention from "mainstream literary culture". I Love Dick was not published in the United Kingdom until 2015.

In 2017, Kraus published After Kathy Acker, a biography of Kathy Acker.

Kraus is a landlord, owning several low-income properties in Albuquerque, New Mexico - she describes this as "a day job". Kraus "chose early on not to pursue full-time teaching", instead focussing on property management which she claims takes "a couple of hours every day".

Works

I Love Dick

I Love Dick is an epistolary novel with autofiction elements. The Guardian described the novel as "a cult feminist classic" despite its poor reception on release in 1997. I Love Dick is written as a series of love letters written to an addressee who is derived from the real-life cultural critic Dick Hebdige. Hebdige described the novel as a violation of his privacy In 2016, Joey Soloway adapted the novel as a TV series, produced by Amazon Studios. The first season was released on May 12, 2017.

Where Art Belongs

Where Art Belongs is a non-fiction essay examining contemporary art and sexuality.  In a series of vignettes, Kraus discusses various forms of early 21st century art, detailing her personal association with some of the artists.  Artists whose work is discussed include Ariel Pink, Bernadette Corporation, Bas Jan Ader, Elke Krystufek, Moyra Davey, Louis Malle, and James Benning.  Ariel Pink's visual art is discussed in connection with Tiny Creatures, an art collective that was active in Los Angeles from 2006-2007.  Elke Krystufek's visits to Easter Island and Palau are described as being inspired by Ader's disappearance at sea, journeys that were undertaken for the purpose of producing art. Photographer Moyra Davey's diagnosis of multiple sclerosis is described as influencing her choice to incorporate writing into her artwork, particularly fragments by Walter Benjamin.  Kraus also discusses her participation in the Sex Workers' Art Show, a touring show which precipitated the firing of Gene Nichol, president of the College of William & Mary, when he allowed the troupe to perform at the college.

Additionally, Kraus cites two historical countercultural documents on sexuality which have informed contemporary art.  Suck was an underground newspaper founded in 1969 by Jim Haynes, Germaine Greer, Bill Levy, Heathcote Williams and Jean Shrimpton.  The twelfth issue of Recherches, a French journal, was edited by Félix Guattari in collaboration with the Front Homosexuel d'Action Révolutionnaire, a gay rights group.  Titled "Three Billion Perverts", the issue was devoted to homosexuality, with many copies being seized and destroyed by French authorities.  Kraus cites Andrea Fraser's Untitled (2003), a video work showing a sexual encounter between the artist and a collector who subsequently purchased a copy of the video, as an example of an artwork informed by the literature.

Semiotext(e)
Sylvère Lotringer, Kraus's husband from the late eighties to the late nineties, founded Semiotexte's Foreign Agents series, which mostly published French critical theorists, in 1980. Ten years later Kraus founded the press's Native Agents imprint to publish fiction, mostly by women, as an analogue to the French theories of subjectivity in the Foreign Agents series. In addition to groundbreaking works of fiction by writers like Michelle Tea and Ann Rower, Native Agents has published notable volumes of poetry and prose by Eileen Myles, Barbara Barg, and Fanny Howe, as well as memoirs and interviews by Kathy Acker, Bob Flanagan, David Rattray, and William Burroughs. In a 2012 piece for n+1, senior editor Elizabeth Gumport wrote "What united the Native Agents authors was the way their work combined elements of theory, fiction, and biography, explicitly refusing to identify absolutely with any single genre."

In 2017, Kraus came under sustained criticism from anti-gentrification activists who believed Kraus & other artists were being used to promote displacement in Boyle Heights, Los Angeles. Semiotext(e) chose to cancel an event at which she was slated to speak rather than face further protests.

Films
Before beginning her career as writer, Kraus was an artist and filmmaker, making a number of short films and videos, including one feature Gravity & Grace. Her films have been the focus of a number of international retrospective exhibitions and screenings, beginning in 2008 with “Plastic is Leather, Fuck You: Film and Video 1983-1993” at Galerie Cinzia Friedlaender, Berlin. In the press release for the 2011 exhibition at Real Fine Arts in Brooklyn, Kraus detailed her thoughts behind the production of these films.

Awards
In 2008, Kraus received the Frank Jewett Mather Award for Art Criticism from the College Art Association.

Publications
I Love Dick, 1997 (Semiotext(e) / Native Agents). 
Aliens & Anorexia, 2000 (Semiotext(e) / Native Agents). 
Hatred of Capitalism: A Semiotext(e) Reader by Kraus and Sylvere Lotringer, 2001. 
Video Green: Los Angeles Art and the Triumph of Nothingness, 2004 (Semiotext(e) / Active Agents). 
LA Artland: Contemporary Art from Los Angeles by Kraus, Jan Tumlir, and Jane McFadden, 2005 (Black Dog). 
Torpor, 2006 (Semiotext(e) / Native Agents). 
I Love Dick by Kraus, Eileen Myles, Joan Hawkins; 2006 (Semiotext(e) / Native Agents).
Where Art Belongs, 2011 (Semiotext(e) / Intervention Series). 
Summer of Hate, 2012 (Semiotext(e) / Native Agents). 
 
After Kathy Acker: A Biography, 2017 (Allen Lane). 
Social Practices, 2018 (Semiotext(e) / Active Agents).

Books in Spanish
Tienda de ramos generales Kelly Lake, 2017 (Cruce Casa).

Filmography and performance history
In Order to Pass (1982), 30 minutes, Super8 film/video.
Terrorists in Love (1985), 5 minutes, Super8 film/video.
Voyage to Rodez (1986), 14 minutes, 16mm film.
Foolproof Illusion (1986), 17 minutes, video.
How to Shoot a Crime (1987), 28 minutes, video.
The Golden Bowl or Repression (1990), 12 minutes, 16mm film.
Traveling at Night (1991), 14 minutes, video.
Sadness at Leaving (1992), 20 minutes, 16mm film.
Gravity & Grace (1996), 88 minutes, Lonely Girl Films (New Zealand/USA/Canada).
Disparate Action/Desperate Action (1980), performance.
Readings From The Diaries of Hugo Ball (1983–84), performance.
Longing Last Longer (1998), performance with Penny Arcade based on I Love Dick, directed by Eric Wallach and produced by The Kitchen, New York, January 1998.

References

External links
 Interview with Chris Kraus for Cultural Icons series. Audio and video
 The Novelist as Performance Artist: On Chris Kraus, the Art World’s Favorite Fiction Writer
 Chris Kraus reading her essay "Greetings from LA" on 'Lectures with Lindsay' audio collection
 Interview with Chris Kraus for Full Stop. 4 December 2012.
 Interview with Chris Kraus for Lenny Letter. With Laia Garcia. 4 August 2017.
 Jamison, Leslie. "This Female Consciousness: On Chris Kraus." New Yorker. 9 April 2015.
 "Chris Kraus." Contemporary Authors Online. Detroit: Gale, 2012. Literature Resource Center. Web. 5 Oct. 2015.
 Chris Kraus Papers, MSS.442, NYU Special Collections

1955 births
Living people
American women writers
Jewish women writers
American film directors
Academic staff of European Graduate School
Victoria University of Wellington alumni
Frank Jewett Mather Award winners
American women academics
21st-century American women writers